Mahmood Mabrook Nasib Al-Mushaifri (born 14 January 1993), commonly known as Mahmood Al-Mushaifri, is an Omani footballer who plays for Al-Nasr in Oman Professional League and the Oman national football team as a defender.

Career

Club 
He won the Oman Professional League in 2017–18 with Suwaiq Club.

International
Al-Mushaifri made his debut for Oman national football team in a friendly match on 8 August 2016 against Turkmenistan. He was included in Oman's squad for the 2019 AFC Asian Cup in the United Arab Emirates.

Career statistics

International
Statistics accurate as of match played 30 December 2018

References

External links

1993 births
Living people
Omani footballers
Oman international footballers
Association football defenders
Suwaiq Club players
Al-Nasr SC (Salalah) players
Oman Professional League players
2019 AFC Asian Cup players
People from Al-Rustaq
Footballers at the 2014 Asian Games
Asian Games competitors for Oman